Yun Qi (贠奇, born December 7, 1995) is a Bantamweight Chinese Sanda kickboxer who has fought in Wu Lin Feng, K-1, Krush, and Glory of Heroes. He has notable wins over the likes of Kosuke Komiyama, Masahiro Yamamoto, and Sergio Wielzen.

Career 
March 3, 2017 in Tokyo, Japan Krush.74, Yun Qi challenged Kaito Ozawa for the Krush  -58 kg World Championship belt. The fight was close with Ozawa being declared the victor by majority decision.

Championships and awards 

Kickboxing
Wu Lin Feng
2014 WLF -60 kg Rookie of the Year
Glory of Heroes
2016 GOH -60 kg Tournament Runner-Up

Kickboxing record

|-  style="background:#fbb;"
| 2020-01-04|| Loss||align=left| Artsem|| Glory of Heroes 45|| Haikou, China || Decision ||  3||3:00 
|-  style="background:#fbb;"
| 2019-12-20|| Loss||align=left| Olsjan Mesoutaj || Glory of Heroes 43 - Gods of War XIII|| Greece || Decision ||  3||3:00 
|-  style="background:#cfc;"
| 2019-09-07|| Win ||align=left| Hassan || Glory of Heroes 41|| China || TKO ||  || 
|-  style="background:#cfc;"
| 2019-05-25|| Win ||align=left| Nikora Lee-Kingi || Glory of Heroes 38: Shantou|| Shantou, China || Decision (Unanimous) || 3 || 3:00
|-  style="background:#fbb;"
| 2018-10-20|| Loss ||align=left| Feng Liang || Glory of Heroes 36: Ziyang|| Sichuan, China || Decision (Unanimous) || 3 || 3:00 
|-
! style=background:white colspan=9 |For the GOH Bantamweight Championship -60 kg.
|-  style="background:#cfc;"
| 2018-09-15|| Win ||align=left| Zheng Junfeng ||Glory of Heroes 34: Tongling|| Tongling, China || Decision (Unanimous) || 3 || 3:00
|-  style="background:#cfc;"
| 2018-05-26|| Win ||align=left| Masahiro Yamamoto||Glory of Heroes 31: Beijing|| Beijing, China || Decision (Unanimous) || 3 || 3:00
|-  style="background:#cfc;"
| 2018-02-03|| Win ||align=left| Sudsakhorn || Glory of Heroes: Chengdu || Chengdu, China || KO || 1 || 0:22
|-  style="background:#fbb;"
| 2017-12-23|| Loss ||align=left| Hakim Hamech || Glory Of Heroes || China || Decision || 3 || 3:00
|-  style="background:#fbb;"
| 2017-07-16|| Loss ||align=left| Sano Tenma|| Krush 77 || Tokyo, Japan || Decision (Unanimous)|| 3 || 3:00
|-  style="background:#cfc;"
| 2017-04-28|| Win ||align=left| Pakkalck || Rise of Heroes / Conquest of Heroes: Chengde || Chengde, China || KO || 1 || 2:57
|-  style="background:#fbb;"
| 2017-03-03|| Loss ||align=left| Kaito Ozawa || Krush.74 || Tokyo, Japan || Decision (Majority)|| 3 || 3:00
|-
! style=background:white colspan=9 |For the Krush -58 kg title.
|-  style="background:#cfc;"
| 2016-12-17 || Win ||align=left| Jay Marrube || Glory of Heroes Rise of Heroes 5 || Nanning, China || TKO (Leg Kick) || 3 || 1:49
|-  style="background:#fbb;"
| 2016-11-03|| Loss ||align=left|  Takeru Segawa || K-1 World GP 2016 Super Featherweight World Tournament, Semi Finals || Tokyo, Japan || KO (Right Cross)|| 2 || 2:31
|-  style="background:#cfc;"
| 2016-11-03|| Win ||align=left|  Shota Kanbe || K-1 World GP 2016 Super Featherweight World Tournament, Quarter Finals || Tokyo, Japan || TKO (Referee Stoppage/Left Flying Knee)|| 3 || 1:32
|-  style="background:#cfc;"
| 2016-10-29 || Win ||align=left| Zarin Omid || Wu Lin Feng || China || KO||  || 
|-  style="background:#fbb;"
| 2016-09-17 || Loss ||align=left| Feng Liang || Glory of Heroes Rise of Heroes 1: -60 kg Tournament Finals || Chaoyang, China || Ex. R Decision (Split) || 4 || 3:00
|-
! style=background:white colspan=9 |For the Glory of Heroes -60 kg Tournament.
|-  style="background:#cfc;"
| 2016-09-17 || Win ||align=left| Dmitrii Sîrbu || Glory of Heroes Rise of Heroes 1: -60 kg Tournament Semi Finals || Chaoyang, China || Ex. R Decision (Unanimous) || 4 || 3:00
|-  style="background:#cfc;"
| 2016-08-06 || Win ||align=left| Kruk Yauhen || Glory of Heroes Rise of Heroes 4 || Changzhi, China || TKO || 1 ||
|-  style="background:#cfc;"
| 2016-06-24 || Win || align=left|  Kosuke Komiyama|| K-1 World GP 2016 -65kg World Tournament || Tokyo, Japan || Decision (Majority) || 3 || 3:00
|-  style="background:#cfc;"
| 2016-05-07 || Win ||align=left| Sergio Wielzen || Glory of Heroes 2 || Shenzhen, China || Decision || 3 || 3:00
|-  style="background:#fbb;"
| 2015-02-07 || Loss||align=left| Xiatekal Wumaneral || Wu Lin Feng || China || Decision || 3 || 3:00
|-  style="background:#cfc;"
| 2014-01-25|| Win||align=left| Yang Shisong|| Wu Lin Feng || China || TKO (High kick)|| 3 || 
|-
| colspan=9 | Legend:

Mixed martial arts record

|-
|Loss
|align=center| 0–1
|Nikora Lee-Kingi
|Knockout (Punches)
|Glory of Heroes 37: New Zealand
|
|align=center| 2
|align=center| 2:44
|Auckland, New Zealand
|

External links
 K-1 profile

References 

1995 births
Living people
Chinese male kickboxers
Chinese male mixed martial artists
Mixed martial artists utilizing sanshou
Chinese sanshou practitioners
Sportspeople from Henan
Chinese wushu practitioners
Bantamweight kickboxers